Expedition Robinson or Expedición Robinson may refer to:

 Expedition Robinson, a Swedish television show
 Expedición Robinson (Argentine TV series), an Argentinian television show
 Expedición Robinson: La Isla Vip, a Chilean television show
 Expedición Róbinson (Colombian TV series), a Colombian television show
 Expedition Robinson (Central Europe), a German and Austrian television show
 Expedition Robinson (Swiss TV series), a Swiss television show
 Expedición Robinson (Ecuadorian TV series)